The Ireland cricket team toured Zimbabwe from 26 September to 30 September 2010 for a three-match One Day International (ODI) series. Zimbabwe won the first two matches to win the series, before Ireland won the final match.

ODI series

1st ODI

2nd ODI

3rd ODI

References

External links
Series home at ESPNcricinfo.com

2010–11 Zimbabwean cricket season
Zimbabwe
Irish cricket tours of Zimbabwe
International cricket competitions in 2010–11